The New Zealand women's national football team, nicknamed the Football Ferns, is governed by New Zealand Football (NZF). The New Zealand national team qualified for the 2007 FIFA Women's World Cup, held in China in September 2007, sending the team to their first World Cup in 16 years, and the second since their 1975 debut in international competition. New Zealand will co-host the 2023 FIFA Women's World Cup alongside Australia, the Football Ferns automatically qualified as co-host.

History
The New Zealand Women's Soccer Association was founded in 1975. By invitation, the team took part in the Asian Women's Championship in 1975 and won the championship. They have since then played in the Oceanic Championship. 

As Australia left OFC, New Zealand had no serious and competitive Rivals in Oceania, which made it easier New Zealand's qualifications to World Cup and Olimpic Tournament, having contested every edition of both tournaments since 2007.

New Zealand will co-host the 2023 FIFA Women's World Cup along with Australia after being awarded on 25 June 2020 as the favourites over Colombia. The Football Ferns automatically qualified as co-host.

Team image

Nicknames
The New Zealand women's national football team has been known or nicknamed as the "Football Ferns".

FIFA world rankings

 Worst Ranking   Best Ranking   Worst Mover   Best Mover

Results and fixtures

The following is a list of match results in the last 12 months, as well as any future matches that have been scheduled.

Legend

2022

2023

 New Zealand Fixtures and Results – Soccerway.com

Coaching staff

Current coaching staff

Players

Current squad
The following players were named to the squad for the 2023 FIFA Women's World Cup qualification (inter-confederation play-offs) friendly matches against Portugal and Argentina between 18 and 23 February 2023.
 Caps and goals are current as of 21 January 2023 after match against United States.

Recent call-ups
The following players have been called up within the last 12 months and remain eligible for selection.

Notes:
 RET Retired from national team.
 INJ Withdrew due to an injury.
 COVID Withdrew due to COVID–19.
 TOP Train-on player.

Captains

Abby Erceg – 49 matches (2013–2017)
Rebecca Smith – 45 matches (2003–2007, 2011–2012)
Hayley Moorwood – 43 matches (2007–2011
Ali Riley – 43 matches (2017– ) †
Barbara Cox - 19 matches (1975,1984–1987)
Terry McCahill – 14 matches (1995–1998)
Marilyn Marshall – 12 matches (?)
Wendi Henderson – 9 matches (2000, 2006–2007
Maureen Jacobson – 9 matches (2005–2006)
Ali Grant – 6 matches (1981–1983)
Leslie King – 5 matches (1991)
Viv Robertson – 5 matches (1998–1991)

†Current New Zealand captain

Records

Bold players are still active.
Statistics as of 21 January 2023.

Most capped players

Top goalscorers

Honours

Continental
OFC Women's Nations Cup
  Champions: 1983, 1991, 2007, 2010, 2014, 2018
  Runners-up: 1989, 1994, 1998, 2003

AFC Women's Championship
  Champions: 1975

Competitive record

FIFA Women's World Cup

Olympic Games

OFC Women's Nations Cup

AFC Women's Asian Cup

Algarve Cup
The Algarve Cup is an invitational tournament for national teams in women's association football hosted by the Portuguese Football Federation (FPF). Held annually in the Algarve region of Portugal since 1994, it is one of the most prestigious and longest-running women's international football events and has been nicknamed the "Mini FIFA Women's World Cup".

SheBelieves Cup
The SheBelieves Cup is a global invitational tournament for national teams in women's soccer hosted in the United States.

See also

Sport in New Zealand
Football in New Zealand
Women's football in New Zealand
New Zealand women's national football team
New Zealand women's national football team results
List of New Zealand women's international footballers
New Zealand women's national under-20 football team
New Zealand women's national under-17 football team

References

External links

FIFA profile

 
Oceanian women's national association football teams